P. S. Rafeeque (born 1978) is an Indian short story writer, screenwriter and lyricist from Kerala. He made his film debut by screenwriting Nayakan (2010). His breakthrough film was Amen (2013), which was a critical and commercial success.

Early life
Rafeeque was born in 1978 at Eriyad village in Kodungallur, Kerala, India, as the son of Palliparambil Seythu and Kolliyil Kunjibeevathu. He is a graduate in English literature.

Career
He made his film debut by screenwriting the action drama Nayakan (2010) directed by Lijo Jose Pellissery. It received positive reviews from critics. Rediff.com wrote that the film "not only grabs your attention by its originality of premise or treatment, but by its sincerity as well". They collaborated again in his second screenplay Amen (2013), a romantic drama, which he wrote based on a one-line told by Pellissery. The film was a critical and commercial success. His 2019 screenplay for Thottappan was based on Francis Noronha's short story.

He collaborated with Pellissery for the third time for Malaikottai Vaaliban, a period drama about wrestling.

Personal life
He is married to Shahana and have two children—Ashna and Isha.

Filmography

Discography

References

External links
 

1978 births

Living people
Screenwriters from Kerala
Malayalam screenwriters
Malayalam-language lyricists